...For the Whole World to See is a studio album by the American band Death, released in 2009 and consisting of various demos originally recorded in the mid 1970s.

History
In 1975 the band entered a studio to record a 12-song album. After refusing to change their group's name, Death was turned away by Clive Davis of Columbia Records. Only seven songs were completed and the album was never released. The surviving songs were released as ...For the Whole World to See in 2009 by Drag City.

Just prior to and right after the record's release, the songs on ...For the Whole World to See were performed live by Rough Francis, a band formed by the three sons of Death's original bassist.  With the record's critical acclaim and praise from many other musicians, the two surviving members of Death reformed the band with a new guitarist to promote the record themselves.

Reception

Initial critical response to ...For the Whole World to See was positive. At Metacritic, which assigns a normalized rating out of 100 to reviews from mainstream critics, the album has received an average score of 76, based on 8 reviews.

Jack White of The White Stripes related his first reaction to the album in a New York Times article: "I couldn't believe what I was hearing. When I was told the history of the band and what year they recorded this music, it just didn't make sense. Ahead of punk, and ahead of their time."

The song "You're a Prisoner" was featured in the 2011 film Kill the Irishman.

The song "Freakin Out" is played in the main action sequence on the sixth episode of the Starz show Ash vs. Evil Dead.

The song "Keep on Knocking" was used for the soundtrack for the video game Tony Hawk's Pro Skater 5.

The song "Politicians in My Eyes" was covered by the band Black Pumas in the deluxe release of their debut album (2019).

The song "Freakin Out" was featured in the 2022 film Wendell & Wild.

Track listing

Personnel
Death
 David Hackney – guitar
 Bobby Hackney – bass, lead vocals
 Dannis Hackney – drums
Technical
 Death – producer
 Tammy Hackney – photography
 Jim Vitti – engineer

References

External links
 

2009 debut albums
Death (proto-punk band) albums
Drag City (record label) albums